Samuel Tonner (10 August 1894 – 1976) was a Scottish footballer who played in the Football League for Bristol City, Crystal Palace and Clapton Orient. His brothers Jack and Jimmy were also professional footballers.

References

1894 births
1976 deaths
Scottish footballers
Association football defenders
English Football League players
Inverkeithing United F.C. players
Dunfermline Athletic F.C. players
Leyton Orient F.C. players
Bristol City F.C. players
Crystal Palace F.C. players
Armadale F.C. players